The Way of Kazakhstan is a book by Nursultan Nazarbayev, the President of the Republic of Kazakhstan. In the book, Nazarbayev describes the process of Kazakhstan's independence and the planning and execution of economic and political reforms. The Way of Kazakhstan was published on 18 May 2010 and presented at a launch event in Salou, Spain.

Said Nursultan Nazarbayev of the book, "I devote this book to our young generation - a special generation. You have been born and are maturing in an independent Kazakhstan already. The time of your youth is the time of our country's rising and blossoming. You have absorbed the spirit of achievement and success. Your destinies will define the destiny of our country.
My book, describing events of the past, is actually oriented towards the future. I hope that my book will be a handbook of future leaders of Kazakhstan."

References

  
 http://www.zakon.kz/172596-v-ispanii-sostojalas-prezentacija-knigi.html
 http://www.kimep.kz/ru-about/news/aug2010/film

2010 non-fiction books
Books about Kazakhstan
Political history of Kazakhstan